Precious is the debut studio album by American singer Chanté Moore. It was released on September 29, 1992, through Silas Records and MCA Records. in the United States. The album featured production from Simon Law, Bebe Winans, George Duke, among others. It was preceded by the release of the singles "Love's Taken Over" and "It's Alright". Two further singles were subsequently released from the album, "Who Do I Turn to" and "As If We Never Met".

The track, "Candlelight and You" first appeared on the soundtrack to the 1991 film House Party 2 starring Kid 'N Play. The album peaked at number one hundred and one on the US Billboard 200 on March 20, 1993. Precious  was certified gold by the Recording Industry Association of America (RIAA) the on November 14, 1994.

Critical reception

Rolling Stones Michael Eric Dyson wrote that on Precious, "ranging from the exhilarating stride she measures on the title track to the infectious groove of "Who Do I Turn To," Moore explores the sweet entanglements of contemporary love with a supple soprano that floats over and into songs [...] Moore's superb singing and writing will unquestionably win her a satisfied audience."

Singles
"Love's Taken Over" was released as the lead single on July 28, 1992. The song peaked at number eighty-six and number thirteen on the US Billboard Hot 100 and the US Hot R&B/Hip-Hop Songs, respectively.

Track listing

Charts

Certifications

Release history

References

External links
 

1992 debut albums
Chanté Moore albums
Albums produced by Simon Law